Rameau Thierry Sokoudjou Nkamhoua (born April 18, 1984), mostly billed simply as Sokoudjou, is a Cameroonian professional mixed martial artist. A professional competitor since 2006, Sokoudjou is the former KSW Light Heavyweight Champion, and has also competed for PRIDE, the UFC, WEC, Affliction, Strikeforce, K-1, DREAM and Bellator.

Background
Born and raised in Cameroon, Sokoudjou began training in judo at the age of five and was talented, winning three consecutive junior national championships from 1997 to 1999 in his home country. Growing up, he had actually wanted to get involved with boxing or kickboxing but his parents would not allow it because they thought the competition was too violent. Sokoudjou moved to the United States in 2001 to pursue his career in judo.

Mixed martial arts career

PRIDE Fighting Championships
In his PRIDE debut at PRIDE 33, Sokoudjou fought Brazilian fighter Antônio Rogério Nogueira, and the much-less experienced Sokoudjou was a 16-1 underdog. To start the match, the Cameroonian threw a series of high kicks before landing an excellent combination that knocked out "Lil Nog" at just 23 seconds into the first round in a shocking upset. This made Sokoudjou the first fighter to finish the younger Nogueira brother. Sokoudjou's victory is considered to be one of the biggest upsets in mixed martial arts history, as well as arguably the biggest win of Sokoudjou's career to date.

Ultimate Fighting Championship
Sokoudjou was released from the UFC on November 28, 2008.

Independent Promotions

Sokoudjou defeated the South-African kickboxer Jan Nortje at Dream 9 by TKO (strikes) in round 1 of the Dream Super Hulk Tournament. Sokoudjou was heavily criticized for his post-fight actions where he landed a barrage of extra punches after the referee had already stepped in to stop the fight. Sokoudjou did, however, express remorse for his actions, and apologized to Nortje for the incident. Sokoudjou was slated to face Gegard Mousasi in the semifinals at Dream 11, however, due to an injury, Super heavyweight Bob Sapp stood in for Mousasi.

Sokoudjou fought Ryan Jimmo for the MFC Light Heavyweight Championship at MFC 31 on October 7 at the Mayfield Conference Centre in Edmonton, Alberta, Canada, losing by a controversial unanimous decision.

Sokoudjou fought Heavyweight prospect Konstantin Erokhin at Fight Nights: Battle Of Moscow 14, on December 7, 2013. He lost via KO in the first round.

Strikeforce
Sokoudjou was defeated by former Strikeforce Light Heavyweight Champion Gegard Mousasi via second-round TKO due to ground and pound on November 7, 2009, at Strikeforce: Fedor vs. Rogers.

KSW and others
Sokoudjou faced European prospect Jan Błachowicz at KSW XV for the KSW Light Heavyweight Championship, After two rounds Sokoudjou landed 12 leg kicks, making Błachowicz unable to continue the fight.

Bellator MMA

In June 2015, it was revealed that Sokoudjou was released from the promotion.

Kickboxing career

Sokoudjou faced Maxim Grishin in a kickboxing match on February 23, 2013, at Fight Nights 10 in Moscow, Russia. He lost via split decision(29–28, 28–29, 28–29).

Personal life
Sokoudjou speaks French, as well as a few dialects in his home country of Cameroon. He currently lives in Southern California and has a brother. Before becoming a professional mixed martial arts fighter, Sokoudjou worked as a bouncer.

Championships and accomplishments

Grappling
Winter National Championship (+100 kg) – 2009
Grappler's Quest – BJJ – 2003
Golden State Championship – 2003
San Jose Buddhist Tournament – 2003
California State Championship – 2002
Tenri 40th Anniversary Championship – 2002
San Jose Buddhist Tournament – 2001
US Open 2001 Las Vegas – Absolute
Silver State Championship – 2001
Gardena Tournament – 2001
Golden State Championship – 2001
Senior National Champion – 2000
Tournoi International de la ville de Yaounde – 2000
Cameroon Junior National Champion – 1999
Cameroon Junior National Champion – 1998
Cameroon Junior National Champion – 1997
Golden gi Champion – 1997

Mixed martial arts
ADFC
2010 ADFC Openweight Grand Prix Semifinalist
DREAM
DREAM Super Hulk Grand Prix Runner-Up
Konfrontacja Sztuk Walki
KSW Light Heavyweight Championship (One time)
Fight of the Night (One Time)
Shark Fights
Fight of the Night (One Time)
Australian Fighting Championship
AFC Light Heavyweight Championship (One time, current)

Mixed martial arts record

| Win
| align=center| 19–18
| Jamie Abdullah
| TKO (punches)
| AFC / Kunlun Fight - Kunlun Fight MMA 16
| 
| align=center|2
| align=center|2:42
| Melbourne, Australia
|Won the AFC Light Heavyweight Championship.
|-
| Loss
| align=center| 18–18
| Sergei Kharitonov
| KO (punch)
| M-1 Challenge 80: Kharitonov vs. Sokoudjou
| 
| align=center|1
| align=center|0:40
| Harbin, Heilongjiang, China
|Heavyweight bout.
|-
|Loss
|align=center|18–17
|Łukasz Jurkowski
|Decision (majority)
|KSW 39: Colosseum
|
|align=center|3
|align=center|5:00
|Warsaw, Poland
|
|-
|Win
|align=center|18–16
|Marcelo Tenorio
|TKO (punches)
|Australian FC 18: Night 1
|
|align=center|1
|align=center|N/A
|Shanghai, China
|
|-
|Loss
|align=center|17–16
| Thiago Silva
|TKO (punches)
|F2N: Fight2Night
|
|align=center|3
|align=center|2:37
|Rio de Janeiro, Brazil
|
|-
|-
|Loss
| align=center| 17–15
| Tomasz Narkun
| TKO (punches)
| KSW 36: Materla vs. Palhares
| 
| align=center| 1
| align=center| 4:38
| Zielona Góra, Poland
|
|-
|Win
| align=center| 17–14
| Matt Hamill
| KO (punches)
| Venator FC 3: Palhares vs. Meek
| 
| align=center| 1
| align=center| 0:37
| Milan, Italy
|
|-
|Loss
|align=center| 16–14
|Paul Buentello
|KO (punches)
|Abu Dhabi Warriors 3
|
|align=center| 3
|align=center| 3:12
|Abu Dhabi, United Arab Emirates
|Heavyweight bout.
|-
|Loss
|align=center| 16–13
|Linton Vassell
|TKO (punches)
|Bellator 134
|
|align=center| 2
|align=center| 3:18
|Uncasville, Connecticut, United States
|
|-
| Win
| align=center| 16–12
| Malik Merad
| TKO (elbows)
| Bellator 127
| 
| align=center| 2
| align=center| 4:04
| Temecula, California, United States
|
|-
| Win
| align=center| 15–12
| Terry Davinney
| Submission (rear-naked choke)
| Bellator 121
| 
| align=center| 1
| align=center| 4:16
| Thackerville, Oklahoma, United States
|
|-
| Loss
| align=center| 14–12
| Konstantin Erokhin
| KO (punches)
| Fight Nights: Battle of Moscow 14
| 
| align=center| 1
| align=center| 2:28
| Moscow, Russia
| 
|-
| Loss
| align=center| 14–11
| Evgeny Erokhin
| TKO (knees)
| Pankration: Mayor Cup 2013
| 
| align=center| 3
| align=center| 4:40
| Khabarovsk, Russia
| 
|-
| Win
| align=center| 14–10
| Seung Bae Whi
| Decision (unanimous)
| Road FC 011
| 
| align=center| 3
| align=center| 5:00
| Seoul, South Korea
|
|-
| Win
| align=center| 13–10
| Denis Komkin
| KO (head kick)
| Pankration: Battle Of Empires 2
| 
| align=center| 1
| align=center| 1:00
| Khabarovsk, Russia
| 
|-
| Loss
| align=center| 12–10
| Jan Błachowicz
| Decision (unanimous)
| KSW 17: Revenge
| 
| align=center| 3
| align=center| 5:00
| Lódz, Poland
|   
|-
| Loss
| align=center| 12–9
| Ryan Jimmo
| Decision (unanimous)
| MFC 31
| 
| align=center| 5
| align=center| 5:00
| Edmonton, Alberta, Canada
| 
|-
| Win
| align=center| 12–8
| Roy Boughton
| Decision (unanimous)
| Score Fighting Series 1
| 
| align=center| 3
| align=center| 5:00
| Mississauga, Ontario, Canada
|
|-
| Win
| align=center| 11–8
| Jan Błachowicz
| TKO (leg injury)
| KSW 15: Contemporary Gladiators
| 
| align=center| 2
| align=center| 5:00
| Warsaw, Poland
| 
|-
| Win
| align=center| 10–8
| Valdas Pocevicius
| Decision (unanimous)
| Israel FC: Genesis
| 
| align=center| 3
| align=center| 5:00
| Tel Aviv, Israel
|
|-
| Loss
| align=center| 9–8
| Shamil Abdurakhimov
| TKO (punches)
| ADFC: Round 2
| 
| align=center| 3
| align=center| 2:17
| Abu Dhabi, United Arab Emirates
| 
|-
| Loss
| align=center| 9–7
| Houston Alexander
| TKO (punches)
| Shark Fights 13: Jardine vs Prangley
| 
| align=center| 2
| align=center| 1:31
| Amarillo, Texas, United States
| 
|-
| Win
| align=center| 9–6
| Joaquim Ferreira
| TKO (punches)
| Impact FC 1
| 
| align=center| 1
| align=center| 1:20
| Brisbane, Australia
|Return to Light Heavyweight.
|-
| Win
| align=center| 8–6
| Dave Herman
| DQ (illegal knees)
| ADFC: Round 1
| 
| align=center| 2
| align=center| N/A
| Abu Dhabi, UAE
| 
|-
| Loss
| align=center| 7–6
| Ikuhisa Minowa
| KO (punch)
| Dynamite!! 2009
| 
| align=center| 3
| align=center| 3:29
| Saitama, Japan
| 
|-
| Loss
| align=center| 7–5
| Gegard Mousasi
| TKO (punches)
| Strikeforce: Fedor vs. Rogers
| 
| align=center| 2
| align=center| 3:43
| Hoffman Estates, Illinois, United States
|Light Heavyweight bout.
|-
| Win
| align=center| 7–4
| Bob Sapp
| TKO (punches)
| DREAM 11
| 
| align=center| 1
| align=center| 1:31
| Yokohama, Japan
| 
|-
| Win
| align=center| 6–4
| Jan Nortje
| TKO (punches)
| DREAM 9
| 
| align=center| 1
| align=center| 2:30
| Yokohama, Japan
| 
|-
| Loss
| align=center| 5–4
| Renato Sobral
| Submission (D'Arce choke)
| Affliction: Day of Reckoning
| 
| align=center| 2
| align=center| 2:38
| Anaheim, California, United States
|
|-
| Loss
| align=center| 5–3
| Luiz Cané
| TKO (punches)
| UFC 89
| 
| align=center| 2
| align=center| 4:15
| Birmingham, England
|
|-
| Win
| align=center| 5–2
| Kazuhiro Nakamura
| TKO (leg injury)
| UFC 84
| 
| align=center| 1
| align=center| 5:00
| Las Vegas, Nevada, United States
|
|-
| Loss
| align=center| 4–2
| Lyoto Machida
| Submission (arm-triangle choke)
| UFC 79
| 
| align=center| 2
| align=center| 4:20
| Las Vegas, Nevada, United States
|
|-
| Win
| align=center| 4–1
| Ricardo Arona
| KO (punch)
| PRIDE 34
| 
| align=center| 1
| align=center| 1:59
| Saitama, Japan
|
|-
| Win
| align=center| 3–1
| Antônio Rogério Nogueira
| KO (punch)
| PRIDE 33
| 
| align=center| 1
| align=center| 0:23
| Las Vegas, Nevada, United States
|
|-
| Loss
| align=center| 2–1
| Glover Teixeira
| KO (punches)
| WEC 24: Full Force
| 
| align=center| 1
| align=center| 1:41
| Lemoore, California, United States
|
|-
| Win
| align=center| 2–0
| Paul Weremecki
| TKO (head kick and punches)
| SF 17: Hot Zone
| 
| align=center| 1
| align=center| 2:11
| Portland, Oregon, United States
|
|-
| Win
| align=center| 1–0
| Gary Padilla
| Decision (split)
| Total Combat 15
| 
| align=center| 3
| align=center| 5:00
| San Diego, California, United States
|

Kickboxing record

Legend:

Bare-Knuckle Boxing

|-
|Loss
|align=center|0–1
|Mighty Mo
|TKO (punches)
|VKB-Valor Bare Knuckle 1 
|
|align=center|3
|align=center|1:26
|New Town, ND, USA, 4 Bears Casino and Lodge
|Heavyweight Tournament Semi-Finals

References

External links
 
 
 U.S. Open Judo Championships Historical Results
 Sokoudjou "African Assassin" - PRIDE FC Profile 

Living people
1984 births
Cameroonian male mixed martial artists
Light heavyweight mixed martial artists
Heavyweight mixed martial artists
Mixed martial artists utilizing Muay Thai
Mixed martial artists utilizing judo
Mixed martial artists utilizing Brazilian jiu-jitsu
Cameroonian male kickboxers
Cameroonian male judoka
Cameroonian Muay Thai practitioners
Cameroonian practitioners of Brazilian jiu-jitsu
Cameroonian emigrants to the United States
Sportspeople from Oceanside, California
Ultimate Fighting Championship male fighters